Missing Me may refer to:

 "Missing Me" (Electric Pandas song), a 1984 single by Electric Pandas
 "Missing Me" (Angie McMahon song), a 2018 single by Angie McMahon
 "Missing Me", a 2021 song by Gunna from the album DS4Ever

English phrases